Yanyi is an American poet and critic. He won the Yale Series of Younger Poets Prize in 2018 for his first book, The Year of Blue Water.

Life 
Yanyi graduated from Columbia University in 2013. He is an associate editor at Foundry and an MFA candidate at New York University. He was an Asian American Writers' Workshop Margins Fellow in 2017-2018. He was a 2015 Poets House Emerging Poets Fellow.

The Year of Blue Water 
In 2018, Yanyi's manuscript was selected as the winner of the Yale Series of Younger Poets Prize. Carl Phillips, the judge for the competition, said of his manuscript: “As its title implies, ‘The Year of Blue Water’ reads as a record of time, a kind of daybook of observations in sentences so crystalline, spare, direct, and yet offhand, that it can be easy to miss, at first, the book’s complexity...The poems...[invite] us into the life they invoke, a life that both argues for and is an example of how identity is multifaceted: the poems’ speaker is an artist, of an apparent immigrant background, is trans, is deeply invested in friendship as a rescuing form of community. Identity, then, as not any one of these things but all of them, each marker of identity at once incidental and essential.”

Works 
 The Year of Blue Water  Yale University Press 2019. ,

References 

Year of birth missing (living people)
Living people
American male poets
21st-century American poets
21st-century American male writers
American writers of Asian descent
American LGBT writers
Columbia College (New York) alumni